The following is the qualification system and qualified athletes, countries and teams for the Archery at the 2023 Pan American Games competitions.

Qualification system 
A total of 98 archers will qualify to compete at the games (49 per gender). A country may enter a maximum of ten archers (five per gender). As host nation, Chile qualifies eight athletes automatically (3 for the men’s and women's recurve event each, 1 for the men’s and women’s compound event each).

The present Qualification System has been designed to ensure 8 recurve teams and 5 compound teams of each gender, as well as the participation of individual archers from as many countries as possible. For this reason, a country can qualify either a 3-archers team or just one archer.

As provided for the Olympic Games, a country cannot participate with two archers in one category for Santiago, except if one of the archers qualified at the Pan American Junior Games in Cali.

As there are countries (Colombia, Venezuela, Panama and Guyana) whose geographical location allows them to compete at the South American Games and the Central American and Caribbean Games, their National Federations must inform World Archery Americas by July 31, 2022, in which of these two Games they want to be considered for Pan American Games qualifying positions. This information must be provided in writing and must be accompanied by a letter of approval of their respective National Olympic Committee.

As Canada and the United States do not compete in any of the Regional Games, they will be the only countries eligible to earn spots in the North American Qualifier.

Recurve 
A country may enter a maximum of three recurve athletes per gender (for a maximum of six total). As host, Chile automatically receives three quotas per gender. At the first qualification tournament, the top five teams in the team event qualify along with three individuals per gender. At the second qualification tournament, the top two team along with two individuals will qualify per gender. If a country that won an individual quota(s) at the first tournament, wins a team quota at the second tournament, those individual spots will be reallocated to the second qualification individual event.

Compound 
A country may enter a maximum of two compound athletes per gender (for a maximum of four total). As host, Chile automatically receives one quota per gender. The top five two-member teams in the first qualification tournament will qualify along with one individual per gender. The remaining spot per gender will be decided at the second qualification tournament.

Qualification timeline

Qualification summary

Recurve men

Recurve women

Compound men

Compound women

References 

P
P
Qualification for the 2023 Pan American Games
Archery at the 2023 Pan American Games